Huminodun is a character in a myth of the Dusun people. According to legend, Huminodun was a maiden sacrificed to feed her famine-stricken people.

Kinoingan and his wife, Sumundu, had an only daughter named Ponompuan. She was named "Huminodun", which means "transferred sacrifice". She was kind hearted, thoughtful and wise beyond her years. 

There was a time in which the land became infertile that it could not grow a single plant to produce food. Kinoingan learnt that the only way to overcome this famine was to sacrifice his daughter. 

Ponompuan willingly accepted his father's demand, and she was determined to save her people from the famine. She told her father,

Huminodun had fulfilled her promise when her spirit emerged from a large jar. The people had the most bountiful harvest that year.

She is believed to be the founder of Momolianism. It was said that after the resurrection of Huminodun, from the original Bambarayon, the lifestyle of the Nunuk Ragang community as they were then known, began to improve as there was an abundant supply of food. The legend goes on to narrate that the spirit of Huminodun founded the Bobolians as they were taught the art of rites, ritual practices and ceremonies, taboos, traditional cultures including the art of gong-beating and the Sumazau dance.

See also 

 Dewi Sri, Javanese rice goddess

Sources 

Kadazan-Dusun people
Malaysian mythology